The Spirit of Christmas 2004 is the 11th compilation album of Christmas-associated tracks in the annual Spirit of Christmas series. It was released in Australia on 13 November 2004 with proceeds going to The Salvation Army's Red Shield Appeal, which supports at-risk children and youth throughout the country. The compilation has contributions from various Australian artists and was produced by Lindsay Field (also compiler) and Glenn Wheatley. It was issued on CD by Myer Grace Bros. and distributed by Sony BMG.

Background
The Spirit of Christmas series started in 1993 when Myer, an Australian department store, wished to continue their philanthropic support in the community, "whilst at the same time providing something special for everyone to enjoy". They choose The Salvation Army's Red Shield Appeal for at-risk children and youth throughout the country as the recipients in 2004. The charity's John Dalzeil specified that funds would go to "special projects in each state such as a free camp in Western Australia for youth who can't afford school excursions or camps". Since 1993 the series had raised more than 4.75 million for the charity. Session and touring musician, Lindsay Field was the executive producer and compiler. Field contacted various fellow Australian musicians – including those he had worked with personally – to donate a track for the compilation, most commonly a new rendition of a standard Christmas carol. Together with Glenn Wheatley (former member of The Masters Apprentices and manager of Little River Band), Field produced the recording for Myer Grace Bros. own label which was distributed by Sony BMG.

Track listing
 "Silent Night" – Christine Anu
 "The Christmas Song" – Guy Sebastian
 "Happy Xmas (War Is Over)" – george
 "Christmas (Baby Please Come Home)" – Jon Stevens 
 "O Holy Night" – Cosima De Vito
 "Too Fat for the Chimney" – Deborah Conway and Willy Zygier 
 "Mary’s Boy Child" – James Reyne 
 "Santa Claus Is Coming to Town" – Stephanie McIntosh
 "Let’s Make a Baby King" – Troy Cassar-Daley
 "We Wish You a Merry Christmas" – James Morrison
 "Six White Boomers" – Russell Coight 
 "Away in a Manger" – Sara Storer
 "I Saw Mummy Kissing Santa Claus" – The Rudolphs

See also
 The Spirit of Christmas
 2004 in music

References

2004 Christmas albums
2004 compilation albums
Christmas albums by Australian artists
The Spirit of Christmas albums